Willie Beavers (born October 2, 1993) is an American football offensive guard for the Arlington Renegades. He played college football at Western Michigan and was drafted by the Minnesota Vikings in the fourth round of the 2016 NFL Draft. Beavers has also played for several other NFL teams.

Professional career

Minnesota Vikings
Beavers was selected by the Minnesota Vikings in the fourth round (121st overall) of the 2016 NFL Draft. On September 3, 2016, he was released by the Vikings and was signed to the practice squad the next day. He was promoted to the active roster on September 27, 2016.

On September 2, 2017, Beavers was waived by the Vikings.

New England Patriots
On September 4, 2017, Beavers was signed to the New England Patriots' practice squad. He was released on September 16, 2017.

Minnesota Vikings (second stint)
On November 7, 2017, Beavers was signed to the Vikings' practice squad. He was released on November 14, 2017.

Seattle Seahawks
On November 28, 2017, Beavers was signed to the Seattle Seahawks' practice squad. He signed a reserve/future contract with the Seahawks on January 2, 2018.

On September 1, 2018, Beavers was waived by the Seahawks.

Chicago Bears
On November 5, 2018, Beavers was signed to the Chicago Bears practice squad. He was released on January 1, 2019. He signed a reserve/future contract with the Bears on January 16, 2019, but was waived on May 2.

San Francisco 49ers
On May 6, 2019, Beavers signed with the San Francisco 49ers. He was waived on August 27, 2019.

Dallas Renegades
Beavers was drafted in the 1st round in phase two in the 2020 XFL Draft by the Dallas Renegades. He had his contract terminated when the league suspended operations on April 10, 2020.

Atlanta Falcons
Beavers had a tryout with the Atlanta Falcons on August 20, 2020. He was signed to the team's practice squad on September 24, 2020. He signed a reserve/future contract on January 4, 2021.

On August 31, 2021, Beavers was waived by the Falcons and re-signed to the practice squad the next day. He signed a reserve/future contract with the Falcons on January 10, 2022. On May 2, 2022, he was released by the Falcons.

Washington Commanders
Beavers signed with the Washington Commanders on June 14, 2022. He was placed on injured reserve prior to final roster cuts on August 30, 2022. He was released on October 18.

References

External links
 Washington Commanders bio
 Western Michigan Broncos bio

1993 births
Living people
American football offensive tackles
American football offensive guards
Atlanta Falcons players
Chicago Bears players
Dallas Renegades players
Minnesota Vikings players
New England Patriots players
Players of American football from Michigan
San Francisco 49ers players
Seattle Seahawks players
Sportspeople from Southfield, Michigan
Western Michigan Broncos football players
Washington Commanders players